Konstantinos Valmas (born 12 March 1998) is a Greek professional footballer who plays as a right back for Gamma Ethniki club AEP Kozani.

References

External links 
 

 

1998 births
Living people
Greece youth international footballers
Greek expatriate footballers
Kallithea F.C. players
Panathinaikos F.C. players
Anagennisi Deryneia FC
Association football defenders
Footballers from Athens
Greek footballers